Chevalier Garden is a Home Ownership Scheme and Private Sector Participation Scheme court in Tai Shui Hang, Ma On Shan, New Territories, Hong Kong near MTR Tai Shui Hang station. It was jointly developed by the Hong Kong Housing Authority and Chevalier Group, and it was the first HOS court developed by Chevalier Group. It has a total of seventeen blocks built between 1987 and 1988.

Background
Chevalier Garden is the first public housing estate in Hong Kong to be built by the Chevalier Group. Later, Chevalier Group had built several public housing estates in Hong Kong, such as Beverly Garden in Tseung Kwan O, Charming Garden in Mong Kok, Cheerful Garden, Fullview Garden and Harmony Garden in Siu Sai Wan, Elegance Garden in Tai Po, Glorious Garden in Tuen Mun, Grandway Garden in Tai Wai and Saddle Ridge Garden in Ma On Shan.

Houses

Demographics
According to the 2016 by-census, Chevalier Garden had a population of 11,064. The median age was 50.1 and the majority of residents (95.7 per cent) were of Chinese ethnicity. The average household size was 3 people. The median monthly household income of all households (i.e. including both economically active and inactive households) was HK$36,670.

Politics
Chevalier Garden is located in Tai Shui Hang constituency of the Sha Tin District Council. It was formerly represented by Michael Yung Ming-chau, who was elected in the 2019 elections until July 2021.

See also

Public housing estates in Ma On Shan

References

Residential buildings completed in 1987
Residential buildings completed in 1988
Home Ownership Scheme
Private Sector Participation Scheme
Ma On Shan
Housing estates with centralized LPG system in Hong Kong